This is  list of all the United States Supreme Court cases from volume 399 of the United States Reports:

External links

1970 in United States case law